A referendum on electoral suffrage was held in Puerto Rico on 1 November 1970. Voters were asked whether the voting age should be lowered from 21 to 18. The reform was approved by 59.2% of voters, with a turnout of just 34.7%.

Results

References

1970 referendums
1970
1970 in Puerto Rico
Suffrage referendums
November 1970 events in North America